Wuon-Gean Ho (born 1973, Oxford) is a British Chinese artist who specialises in printmaking and whose work has appeared in various international art exhibitions and art collections. She has taken on art residencies at a number of institutions including the Caldera Arts Center, Crow’s Shadow Institute of the Arts, Bluecoat Arts Centre and Aberystwyth School of Art. Examples of her work are displayed at both the National Art Library and the Tate Library. In 2014 she was commissioned by the Royal Mint to design their annual Lunar coin series for which she has done five years in a row.

Biography
Wuon-Gean Ho was born in Oxford to Malaysian and Singaporean parents who moved to London in the 1960s to study. Her mother was a nurse and her father was a veterinary physician. She graduated in 1998 from Cambridge University with a degree in the History of Art and gained a license to practice veterinary medicine. After university she applied for a Japanese scholarship to study traditional woodblock printmaking in Kyoto and later returned to the UK to work in printing.

Commissions
 Cover art for 2011 novel The Tiger's Wife
 Animal designs for the Royal Mint's Lunar coin series

References

External links
Official website

1973 births
Living people
21st-century British women artists
Artists from Oxford
Alumni of the University of Cambridge
English people of Chinese descent
English people of Malaysian descent
English people of Singaporean descent
British currency designers
Women graphic designers